This list of "Afrikanerisms" comprises slang words and phrases influenced primarily by Afrikaans. Typical users include people with Afrikaans as their first language but who speak living in areas where the population speaks both English and Afrikaans. Many of these terms also occur widely amongst ethnic/native South Africans, and others living in neighbouring countries such as Zimbabwe, Botswana, Zambia, etc. These terms do not occur in formal South African English.

Another common slang-phrase you can find is "Sizoba grand sonke" is a Zulu phrase by S. Lucas in South Africa meaning "we will all make it".

"Voetsek" or simply "tsek" is a fun way of telling someone to "fuck off". This is also used to scare unwanted animals away.

"Jou Ma se gat" or "Jou Ma se poes" is a derogatory phrase that literally translates to "Your Mom's hole" or "Your Mom's vagina". This is often seen as more aggressive than the previously mentioned phrase "voetsek".

Although the next phrases are not inherently Afrikaans, they can be used in the Afrikaans language. Normally, in other English speaking countries, when you say you're doing something "now now", you would assume it means that you will do said thing right away. In South Africa, the phrases "now now", "just now" and "right now" all mean different things; "Now now" often meaning minutes later, "just now" meaning hours later and "right now" meaning now. Example: I am going to see a movie just now.I will drive there now now. I am at the movies right now.

Original South African English coinages 
See also Afrikanerisms below

 aswell – increasingly pronounced with emphasis on the "as"
 boykie or boytjie – meaning a young male who is cool in the high-school stereotype kind of way. Sporty and tanned, uses a lot of slang. From English "boy" and the Afrikaans diminutive "-tjie".
 boy – a disrespectful term used to describe a young black man or a young male of any ethnicity, depending on context
 buddy -  while the original English meaning stays intact, it also refers to the 500ml/440ml bottles of Soft drink, for example: "Can I get a buddy Coke?"
 baff – act of flatulence, for example: "Did you baff?"
 boney – Bicycle or motorbike
 bra – male friend (shortening of brother, see also bru above)
 breakdown – an average pick-up that's been specially modified into a tow-truck. Often modified for performance.
 buttons – mandrax tablet (slang only)
 canyon crab – derogatory term for Afrikaner
 carrots -  broken, done over, beaten up.
 chase – leave, go; analogous to "blow" or "duck", as in "Bru, let's chase."; "This place is dof; I'm gonna chase, boet."
 chips or cherps – "Watch out" or "Move out the way", as in "Chips chips everyone, here comes the teacher!" (distinct from the food or snack). Also often used when something gets thrown, or to ask someone to step out the way. Compare "heads up!"
 chop – idiot
 chot – an offensive term for a sexually active female
 civvies – taken from the English term "civilian wear", it refers to day-to-day clothes worn when out of school or military uniform. Casual Fridays are encouraged annually due to the public school system's dress code employing a uniform, similar to European school dress codes. So once or twice a year, students are encouraged to come to school in their civvies.
 clutchplate – derogatory term for Afrikaner
 coconut – lit. coconut fruit; can be used as a racist remark towards black people who behave like Caucasians, "brown on the outside, white on the inside".
 connection – a friend, mate, chommie
 cozzie – a swimsuit, short for swimming costume
 crunchie – derogatory term for Afrikaner
 diss – to intentionally disregard somebody else. That oke is totally dissing me
 double-up - simply means a "shortcut" but usually in this case not a lot of people know about that route.
 duck/dip – To leave or go, primarily when talking about leaving a location, from the English "duck" (derived from but not related to the bird)."Im gonna make a duck from this party, bru"
 flip – A euphemism for the vulgar f-word. Used in various phrases to express anger, annoyance, contempt, impatience, or surprise, or simply for emphasis.
 force -when someone does something unnecessarily, too many times for the given situation or adds something to a conversation that is not necessary (It is a noun and verb)
 give rocks – to be indifferent. For example: “I give rocks about your concerns!” (I couldn't care about your concerns!) Can also be abbreviated to "Give rocks.", and the negative version "I don't give rocks" means exactly the same thing.
 giyn – a homosexual male
 graze – a term used in reference to food. "I'm starving, let's go get some graze."
 higher grade – a bit too complicated (from the South African matric division of exams into standard grade and higher grade. The system of dividing subjects into higher and standard grade has become non-existent as of 2008.)
 howzit – lit. "how is it". An informal greeting similar to "hi". It is important to note that the last thing anyone expects is for you to actually start telling them how things are.
 hundreds – good, fine, as in 100 percent; for example: Splaff: "Howzit bru, how are you?" Bazza: "I'm hundreds boet."
 jukka – a lazy person or a loser
 just now, sometime in the near future or the near past, not necessarily immediately. Expresses an intention to act soon, but not necessarily immediately, or expresses something that happened in the near past.  Probably from the Afikaans netnou with the same meaning. 
 Dutchman – derogatory term for Afrikaner
 glug-glug, ama-glug-glug – lit. the sound made by a flowing liquid through a small opening, like a bottle being emptied. Also refers to a viral television advertisement from the 1980s (involving a little boy playing with his toy Ferrari Testarossa) by the South African Oil company, Sasol. The term also became one of Sasol's signature slogans.
 isit – (pronounced: \izit\) the words "is" and "it" put together. Short term for "Is that so?" (For example: John: "Bra, I just found out I have a million dollars!" Charles: "Isit?"; or: John: "Bru, you would not believe how amazing it felt to footskate in front of all those people." Charles: "Isit?") Also, it can mean "really?"
 kiff - nice, good, cool
 kokie pen –  a felt tip pen, similar to a sharpie.
 lokshin – a Bantu township, from the alternate term, "location".
 nca – meaning something is nice (the nc is a nasalised dental click)
 now now – an immediate but not literal declaration of impending action, may be past or future tense. From the Afrikaans expression "nou nou".
 OK - lit. "okay" (alternatively pronounced in Afrikaans as "oë-kah") while its original English meaning stays intact, it is also the name of a local retail franchise owned by Shoprite. When used in conjunction with the original word "okay", the franchise's name can become a source of comedy, for example: "I'm at the OK, okay!"
 packet or "checkers packet" – a plastic bag
 penalty – refers to someone tripping (usually shouted if someone almost trips)
 Peppermint Crisp - is a milk chocolate bar invented in South Africa by Wilson-Rowntree, now produced by Swiss chocolatier Nestlé. It features thin layers of milk chocolate and tubes of mint-flavoured crunch. It is also popularly used as a topping on a milk-based tart that shares its name.
 Prestik - brand name for a sticky substance normally used to attach paper to walls, similar to Blutack 
 pong - refers to a strong sense of stench or bad odor.
 pull through (pull in) – come or arrive, especially to a place/event that is amenable: "We're having a great jol here, boet. You should pull through."
 robot – alongside its original English meaning, it is also used exclusively in South Africa, to refer to a traffic light. Originating from traffic guards during the British colonization period, for moving like a robot while directing traffic. Though the traffic guard has largely been replaced by the traffic light, the name stuck.
 rockspider – derogatory term for Afrikaner. Though more well known as a national Battle of the Bands-style competition called Rockspaaider that was hosted by JIP, a teen-based lifestyle series, on the Afrikaans music channel MK.
 rooinek – derogatory term for an Englishman, literally someone with fair skin whose neck is sunburned red.
 rop – nice, radical. (e.g. "That was such a rop wave.") Also used as a verb meaning 'to steal'. (e.g. "I will rop you of that kief watch.")
 saamie/saarmie – a sandwich
 scheme – to think or plan to do something (e.g. "I scheme we should go home now"; usage evolved from the hyperbole "What are you scheming?" asked of a person deep in thought.)
 schweet - a variation of the expression "sweet"
 siff – if something is gross or disgusting or ugly. "Did you see her oufit? It was totally siff!"
 skipper - a t-shirt
 skyrocket/sky-rocket - contrary to the original meaning of the English name, it refers to a portable toilet.
 slops – flip-flops
 speak goat – derogatory term for speaking Afrikaans
 soapie – a soap opera
 soutpiel – a derogatory term for someone of British decent who has one foot in England and one foot in South Africa, and their penis dangling in the Atlantic Ocean.
 spinning - alongside its original English meaning (to spin or turn), it also refers to a popular local motorsport culture. Whereby a driver would spin his car's wheels while performing a doughnut and various other drift-style maneuvers for showcase value in front of an audience.
 swak – see "swat". From the Afrikaans for "weak"
 swat – carrying out an action resulting in an undesirable or negative outcome; "when you chaffed my cherrie the other day, it was swat oke.  Totally swat"; "Moderating a list of slang words is impossible and totally swat oke"; "Changing this word to swak would be totally swat oke".
 takkies – sneakers; sports shoes, perhaps from when the soles were made of tacky crepe rubber.  As in "slap takkie when the robot tunes favour:" hit the gas when the traffic light says go.
 tata/ta ta/ta-ta - Is a goodbye greeting of British origin.
 taxi - alongside the original meaning, it is also often shouted in bars or restaurants when someone accidentally spills their drink. Basically, this person is obviously so drunk that a taxi should be called immediately to take them home.
 tickey – thruppence, three pence, from the days of pounds, shillings and pence before 1960.  "You could get a tickey for returning a coke bottle and three tickeys would buy you an eskimo pie". A tickey-box was a payphone, which cost a tickey to make a call.
 town - the city centre (CBD is used in more formal contexts), e.g. "It's too much of a headache to find parking in town, so I go to the mall instead". Also used to refer to the city of Durban when in any of the smaller towns along the south coast between Durban and Port Shepstone. "Hey china, lets go for a jol in town tonight!" 
 traffic circle – roundabout (road)
 tune – to give someone lip ("Are you tuning me skeef?")
 zamalek – Black Label Lager, locally brewed under licence; derived from the Egyptian football team of the same name because of the team colours. A very popular local beer because of its high alcohol content.

List of Afrikanerisms

A–M 
aya - brother and rasta 
Abba - not to be confused with Swedish pop-group ABBA, it is a title given to God the Father, derived from the Aramaic word for father.
abba - to carry someone (normally a child) on one's back.
africtionary - Website for African Slang dictionary.
 ag man – oh man; ag as the Afrikaans equivalent to "oh" (pronounced \jach\ like German ACHtung), "man" pronounced as in "mun" in "munches".
 ag shame – both an expression of pity and sorrow, depending on context: Ag shame, daardie baba is te oulik! (Awe that baby is so cute!); Ag shame, die arme hond is dood. (Ah shame, the poor dog died.)
 antie – an older female authority figure. Derived from the English "aunt", with the original meaning still intact.
 anties – breasts/boobs or plural of the word "aunt"
 aweh/awe (pronounced \AAAH-WHE\) – said in excitement, as in: 'Aweh; my boss said I can go home early today.', 'or 'Ok, cool'.' Same as the English pop culture slang 'yas'. The word has many meanings or uses: "hello", "goodbye", "yes", "cool". Also associated with prison use. (Greeting)  "Aweh, my bru." (Hello my friend). Similar: howzit, yooit, hoesit, yo.
 babbelbekkie – someone who talks a lot
 babelaas / babbelas – hangover (of Xhosa origin)
 bakgat – cool; expression of appreciation for something very well accomplished
bakore - lit "bowl ears", refers specifically to people who have Protruding ears, like a bowl's handles.
 bakkie – a utility truck or pick-up truck, now a mainstream word in South African English. Can also refer to a small plastic container/bowl.
 balla – lit. "balls". Refers to the scrotum or penis.
 balsak – lit. "ball-sack". Refers specifically to the scrotum.
 bangbroek – lit. "scaredy-pants"
 befok – really good, exciting, cool; as in "The rock-show was befok." (Do not confuse with gefok.). Also means to be extremely angry(kwaad); as in "Ek is nou so befok". Can also mean "crazy" in a very strong sense, as in "Are you befok?" – derogatory. Can also mean "to have sex with".
 befoetered/bedonnered/bemoerd – lit. "extremely angry" similar to "diedonnerend", etc. Usually used to refer to a person who is often in a very bad mood.
 bergie – from Afrikaans berg, which translates to "mountain", originally referring to vagrants who sheltered in the forests of Table Mountain; now a mainstream word for a particular subculture of vagrants, or homeless persons, especially in Cape Town.
 beter bang Jan, as dooie Jan – lit. "better to be a scared Jan rather than a dead Jan". English equivalent is "better to be safe than sorry".
 bietjie-baie – lit. "a little bit too much". "bietjie" (a little bit – "be-key") and "baie" (a lot – "bye-ya")
 bielie – a butch, yet friendly and often brave man with a lot of stamina. Someone who will lovingly do something tough no matter if the odds are stacked against him. Derived from the folk song "Jan, Jan, Jan, die bielie van die bosveld". Which describes a man (Jan) who is willing to do any form of hard labour with a smile on his face.
 blerrie/bladdy hell – damn/damnit. Originally from the British English phrase "bloody hell".
 bliksem – strike, hit, punch; also used often as an expression of surprise/emphasis. It derives from the Dutch word for "lightning", and often occurs in conjunction with donner. "Bliksem! Daai weerlig was hard!". (Damn! That lightning-strike was loud!) Used as a curse in Afrikaans: "Jou bliksem!" (You bastard!)
 bliksemse – lit. "damn thing" Used in conjunction with "donnerse".
 bloutrein – literally "blue train", referring to methylated spirits, sometimes used for drinking (filtered through a loaf of white bread). Also refers to the Blue Train, a luxury train that travels from Johannesburg to Cape Town via the Trans Karoo rail-line aka "Transkaroo".
 boef – lit. "law-breaker". Refers to any person who has broken a law and got away with it. Derived from the Afrikaans word of the same spelling for "to cuff" (i.e. to arrest, or get arrested). The plural "boewe", refers both to multiple persons in arrest and the handcuffs themselves. Considered outdated as "bliksem" and "skelm" are more commonly used.
 boer – literally "farmer" in Afrikaans. (pronounced boo-(r)). Also the verb "to farm".
 boer maak 'n plan – "farmer makes a plan" is an expression used to refer to a creative solution, often low-cost and rather innovative.
 boererate – a number of local home remedies that are super effective and cheap. May also be applied to DIY projects.
 boerewors – a very popular mixed-meat spiced sausage in South Africa. In Afrikaans, literally "farmer's sausage", used as a mainstream word in South African English.
 boerewors roll/boerie roll – the South African equivalent of the hot dog, using the boerewors with an onion relish in a hot dog bun
boggerol/bugger-all - Anglicism with identical meaning (absolutely nothing), usually succeeding the words "sweet blou/blue" to emphasize the "nothingness" of the topic.
 boland – refers to the geographic region north of Cape Town. See Boland.
bollie - lit "to poop". Of unknown origin, it is the Afrikaans equivalent of "poop". Due to the fact that it's the most child-friendly description of defecation.
 bokkie – (diminutive of bok, literally meaning "little buck" or "doe") a popular term of endearment, comparable to "sweetheart", "honey", etc. Another meaning for the word bokkie (or bokbaardjie) is for a style of beard which is short (often pointy) and stylish and often surrounds just the mouth and chin in a circle (Goatee). Based on the Afrikaans word bok (lit. "buck", as well as goat). 
 boom – marijuana (literally tree)
 bosberaad – strategy meeting held in a rural setting
 bossies, or bosbefok – crazy, whacko, mad. Also a term for one who has shell shock. Refers to the time of the South African Border War where soldiers spent time in the bush ("bos/bosse") and would return home suffering battle flash-backs (Post-traumatic stress disorder).
 braai – a barbecue, to barbecue (from braaivleis – grilled meat), used as a mainstream word in South African English. Specifically to grill meat on an open fire. As a noun, it is also the literal area/object used for the grilling of the meat (in that case, the barbecue grill and stand) as well as the social gathering around it.
 braaivleis – same as braai
 braaibroodjies – toasted sandwiches that are grilled over an open flame on a braai. Usually served as a side-dish to braaivleis.
 brak – mongrel dog, can also refer to brackish water
 branna – short for "brandewyn" (lit. "brandy")
 broekie – panties or ladies underwear. From Afrikaans: broek, meaning "trousers/briefs". Common usage: "Don't get your broekies in a knot" which means "Calm down".
 broekie lace – ornate ironwork found on Victorian buildings (lit. 'pantie lace'), the tie that you find on board shorts
 bro/bra/bru/boet/boetie – a close male friend and a term of affection used by one male to another. All words are variations of the word "broer" in Afrikaans meaning "brother". Boetie (Pronounced 'Boet - tea') specifically means little brother in Afrikaans because of the "ie" diminutive suffix. You could say, "Hey bro, howzit" or "Thanks a million bro for lending me your car". When you refer to another male as bro is it because you consider that person to be such a good friend he is like a brother, a family member. Bro can also be used for strangers but only also if you wish to show a welcoming and friendly attitude towards them or when you want to deescalate tension in a friendly way as in "Chill out bro". However you would certainly not walk around calling every man you see, bro, because in South Africa the term is not used as loosely as it is in the US for example. 
 bring-en-braai/bring-and-braai – guests bring their own food and drink (usually pre-prepared, except for the meat) to the braai. Traditions surrounding the event usually stipulate that any left-over food and drinks are left behind with the hosts of the party as a parting gift, unless the food was pre-prepared in a personal container.
 bromponie – lit. "a noisy pony", refers to a scooter motorcycle, because a full-size motorcycle is often referred to as an "ysterperd" (iron horse), considering a pony is much smaller than a horse.
brommer -  lit. "a noise maker" refers to a noisy fly, more specifically to the genus Morellia (which is much larger than its cousin, the common housefly).
 buk – duck your head down quickly, as in "Buk when you go in the door; it's really low."
 bucks – from the English word meaning (antelope) it refers to money (currency), although borrowed from the American term of the same meaning, coincidentally there are two types of bucks featured on the coins of the South African Rand (Springbok on the R1 and Kudu on the R2). Not to be confused with the "Bokke" (Springbokke/Springbucks).
 chaai – used to describe something confusing or frustrating e.g “That test was chaai!” 
 cherry – "meddie"
 chommie – a friend (similar to English "chum"). Also spelled tjommie.
 "chop/tjop" – it literally means a piece of meat ("pork chop" or "lamb chop") that you would often cook on a braai. If you can call someone a chop it means they are being silly or an acting like an idiot, "Don't be a chop". Calling someone a chop often does not mean any harm, it is a light and playful insult and this word is most commonly used in a friendly way between associates. It can also be meant in a teasing way, like "dont be silly".
 chop-chop – lit. means "quickly". Is used when a person has had something done, or wants to have something done in a short amount of time. Derived from the chopping of a knife.
 choty goty – beautiful girl
 chrisco – a party/disco where Christian music mainly features; a combination of the words "Christian" and "disco"
 Chwee chweereekeys – getting high
 koeldrank/cooldrink – refers to a soft drink
 dagga – most commonly used word for marijuana
 dice – not to be confused with the game of dice, it refers to a form of amateur motor-racing where 2 or more vehicles sprint to an impromptu Finish Line on public roads. Often considered to be a part of illegal street racing, dicing under the legal limit though is usually permitted, though still frowned upon.
 dik – lit. "thick". Can be a derogatory term for being overweight, similar to "dikgat", as well satiety (or the sensation of being full)
 dikbek – grumpy, in a huff (literally: "thick mouth" (pout)
 dikgat – lit. "fat-arsed". Derogatory term for overweight people, same as "vetgat"
 diedonnerin; diemoerin; diebliksemin – lit. extremely angry. From "donner", "moer" and "bliksem", all meaning to "hit/ strike (someone)".
 dinges – thingamabob, a whatzit or a whatchamacallit. Dutch – dinges.
 dof – stupid or slow to understand. "Are you dof?"
 Dog het gedog hy plant 'n veer en 'n hoender kom op – lit. "Thought thought it would plant a feather and then a chicken would come up". Used in retort when someone says they thought something was a good idea and it turned out not to be.
 doos – literally "box". Depending on context, the slang/derogatory version can mean prat, twat, idiot but most commonly understood as a translation of "arsehole" or "cunt", which in that case would be considered highly offensive.
 domkop – idiot (lit. dumbhead), same as German "Dummkopf" or Dutch "domkop"
 dom nool – emphasis of "stupid idiot"
 donner – to beat up. Same as "bliksem". Derived from "donder" (thunder, related to Thor).
 donnerse – lit. "damn thing". Often used in frustration with another person or thing: "Die donnerse ding wil nie werk nie." ("The damn thing doesn't wanna work").
 dop – alcohol, to drink alcohol, to fail a test. Originally refers to a tot (measure). The diminutive form "doppie" refers to a bottle cap.
 doss, dorse, dossing – sleep or nap
 draadsitter – lit. "fence sitter". Refers to someone who is uninterested in choosing a side in an argument and therefore remains neutral.
 draadtrek - lit. pull wire, to masturbate
 droëwors – (Afrikaans) dried boerewors, similar to biltong
 drol – lit. a turd (vulgar); also refers to an arsehole/idiot; a cigarette, with a singly sold cigarette called a 'los drol' ("loose cigarette") 
 dronkie – drunkard
 druk – to embrace or squeeze, hug (noun) "Gee my 'n drukkie," "Give me a hug"
 druk 'n drie, druk a drol, druk 'n vinger in jou hol – lit. "score a try, squeeze a turd and insert your finger into your anus". A crude but humorous way to say "go finger-fuck yourself"
 eh pappa! – lit. "whoa daddy!"
 eina! – ouch!
 eish! – Wow! What? Expression of surprise. Of Bantu origin.
 ek sê – "I say!" Used when making a statement.
 ent, entjie - cigarette, can also refer to the act of smoking a cigarette.
 flou – an unfunny (weak) joke (from the Afrikaans word for weak), can also refer to weak coffee or tea or weak alcoholic drink. A person that is weak.
 fok – Afrikaans for "fuck", can be used in most ways it is used in English. Fokken = fucking, gefok = fucked. Dutch – Fokken = breeding (animals).
 fokker – lit. "fucker".
 fokkoff  – lit. "fuckoff" (vulgar)
 fokkol – lit. "fuck-all". Literally means "absolutely nothing" (vulgar): Ek het fokkol geld ("I've got no money").
 fok voort – lit. to proceed in a single-minded direction regardless of obstacles. Derived from the phrase: Kyk Noord en Fok voort. (Look North, and go forth).
 fok weet – lit. "fuck knows". A response to an unanswerable question (vulgar).
 FPK  – flying poes klap, see poesklap
 gat – lit. "hole". Also refers lit. to "arse". Can also be used as a shortened version of the word "gaan" (going to).
 gatkruip – lit. "arse creeping" or brown nosing
 gatvol – lit. annoyed enough to the brink of getting angry: Ek is gatvol vir jou kak. (I've had enough of your shit.)
 Gebruiker – cigarette
 gemorsjors - lit. "a messy person". refers to a person who is behaving, and/or dressing, in a very messy (gemors) manner.
 geit – (pronounced "gate", with the "g" sound in the back of the throat) It literally means "quirks". Usually a negative connotation in relation to a person being either: stubborn, fussy or demanding and sometimes also relating to hypochondriasis. Literal English translation will align it with "-ness" (a.i. hardness, stubbornness). An example is: "hardegat-geit" (lit. hard-arsed and cocky).
 gham – A word to describe someone that acts out in a uncivilzed manner, or refer to lower class person. (other words would be "tappit", :kommen: or when someone is gham it portrays them as being poor and or dirty.). "Ew, that guy is so gham!"
gin-en-gaap - An expression of unknown origin, describes a person who is wasting time by either laziness or being too slow. Gaap is Afrikaans for yawn.
 goffel – ugly girl or woman. For example, "What a G!". Also a degrading term for a person of coloured origin.
 gomgat – bumpkin, redneck (in the US sense, not to be confused with rooinek, the literal translation of redneck).
 goof, ghoef – swim, take a dip
 goofed, ghoefed – stoned
 gooi – throw, chuck or to "tune" (see below) someone
 goose – also chick, cherry: a young woman or girlfriend (used mainly during the 1950s, now dated). Also a famous line by South African comedian Barry Hilton.
 gril - (pronounced with the g-sound in the back of the throat) it refers to a person having an adverse sensory reaction to something that is considered disgusting, creepy or freaky in any way. The closest English equivalent would be "hair-raising". Usually used in the phrase "ek gril myself dood vir...." (i get freaked-out by...).
 gwai - also cigarette. derived from "give me a cigarette. Translated - "gee da n gwai"
 hardegat-, gheit – lit. "hard-arsed".  Describes the stubbornness of a person.
 Hier kom Groot Kak! - lit. "Here's comes big shit" Is an expression of revelation towards an often impending and undesired result.
 hoesit, hoezit – derived from "How is it going? – contracted to how's it? In South African English context, howzit is more a greeting of "hello" rather than "how are you?", similar to South African black slang's "eta" or "ola"
 hoer en remoer - lit "whoring around" by either throwing wild parties, or having casual sex with just about every attractive person you meet, applies to both genders.
 hokaai stop die lorrie! – lit. "Whoa there! Stop the lorry!". Often used to call an immediate halt in whatever is being done, usually in conjunction with a possible undesirable outcome.
 hol – lit. hollow. It also refers to "run very fast" ("Daai man hol so vinning"; "That man runs so fast"). Also refers to anus.
 holskeurend – lit. "anus-ripping". Refers to hysterical laughter.
 holvlos - lit. "arsehole-floss", refers to a G-string.
 honne – informal spelling and pronunciation of "honde" (dogs). 
 hottentot - derogatory term describing people of multiracial ethnic backgrounds, especially those of Malaysian-descent (i.e. the majority of Capetonians).  The word is derived from the early Dutch term for the Khoi-San people.  "Hottentotsgod," or Hottentots' god, is Afrikaans for a Praying Mantis).
 huistoegaantyd - lit. "time to go home". From "huis+toe" (to+home), "gaan" (go) and "tyd" (time).
 hy sal sy gat sien - lit. "he'll see his arse" fig. "He'll have his come-uppance"
 roomys-karretjie/ice-cream-karretjie - lit. "ice-cream car" refers to a purpose-modified vehicle that drives around and sells ice cream. Referred to in the U.S. as an "ice cream truck" and in the UK as an "ice-cream van". It also is considered a nickname for the Volkswagen Type 2 and Volkswagen Type 2 (T3), due to both vehicle's immense popularity in that configuration. Even though it is technically a panel van, it's still referred to as a "karretjie".
 in sy moer in – badly damaged, destroyed (rude, often considered profanity due to 'moer' to beat up). often used in conjunction with "moer-in".
 in sy glory in – same as above, considered to be less rude.
 innie/oppie – informal combined spelling of the phrases "in die" (in the) and "op die" (on the).
 in jou noppies - lit. "you are thrilled". Used to describe levels of excitement, similar to "tickled pink".
ipekonders - commonly pronounced as "iepie-corners", refers to Hypochondriasis. Unlike the actual disorder, it is often used to comically exaggerate a person's reaction to any kind of symptoms that are generally considered harmless regardless of the discomfort caused by them. Like when someone drinks cough-syrup after coughing just twice.
 ja – yeah (literally "yes" in Afrikaans)
 Jakob regop – lit. "Jacob upright". Refers to an erect penis.
 jakkals trou met wolf se vrou – lit. "Jackal weds Wolf's wife". Refers to the weather phenomena known as a "monkey's wedding". Can be used to describe an unlikely situation. Also refers to a song of the same name by Afrikaans singer Karlien Van Jaarsveld.
 jux/juks/jags – Meaning "horny". For example, "Jinne meisie, jy maak my nou sommer lekker jags."
 ja-nee – literally "yes-no", an expression of positive confirmation. Example : Dis warm vandag. ("It's hot today") : Ja-nee ("Indeed")
 Jan Allerman - lit. "Jan Every man". Local variant of the American term "Average Joe."
 jippo - Bypass, hack, slacking, short-term fix. I'll jippo the alarm to not make a sound while we work on it. While the team was working hard all night, Byron was jippoing.
 jippo-guts - Diarrhoea
 jislaaik! – expression of surprise, can be positive or negative. Often used when you get a fright, but equally often during particularly exciting parts of a rugby game.
 jissie – a shortened version of "jislaaik".
 jinne – another variation of "jislaaik".
 jip - informal for "yes".
 jo – an exclamation e.g., "Jo, that was rude," "Jo, you gave me a fright!" Pronounced as in "yolk".
 jol – to have fun, to party, can also refer to a disco or party, to commit adultery or even dating or courting
 jou ma se poes! – lit. "your mom's pussy" (vulgar).
 Juffie – the shortened version of "Juffrou". "Juffrou" is a shortened version of the formal title given to address a young unmarried woman "Mejuffrou" (Miss). It is also the formal title given to address a female teacher of any age or marital status, whereby "Juffie" would be considered informal.
 kaalgat - lit. "naked arse". Derived from the word "kaal" (naked), it's simply a more humorous description. Similar to the English term "birthday suits".
 Kaapse Dokter/Cape Doctor - A strong south-eastern wind in the Cape Peninsula-area. Called the "doctor" due to the belief that it clears the Cape Town air of its pollution.
 Kaapse Draai - lit. "Cape turn", refers to a folk song (of the same name) that describes a flightpath around the Cape Peninsula literally as the Pied crow flies (known as a Witborskraai in Afrikaans), can now be applied to actual tours around the peninsula. Singer Nádine released a single based on the folk song, with the same name. It also jokingly refers to a car that turns far to wide (i.e. like crossing into the oncoming lane).
 kafee/cafee/kaffie/caffie - refers to a café, though it can also refer to a small non-coffee serving grocery shop or Tuck shop.
 kaffer – Offensive pejorative referring to a black African. Derived from the Arabic word Kafir meaning a non-Muslim, which included black Africans along the Swahili coast.
  kaffer wil nie val nie  - a phrase referring to the consumption of KWV. Often used by black South Africans at shebeens.
 kak – Literal translation: shit, crap, rubbish, nonsense (vulgar), of very wide usage. Also used as a way of further expressing one's feeling in language, for example, instead of "that girl is pretty" one can say emphatically "that girl is kak pretty!"
 kak en betaal - lit "shit and pay". Used when frustrated about spending all your hard-earned money on family, or friends, and having none left for yourself. Closest English equivalent is "Cough it up and pay up", but it doesn't have anywhere near the same power.
 kakhuis – lit. "shithouse". Refers to both a toilet and the bathroom it is located in, as well as "a lot of".
 kakspul – lit. "shithouse/shitload". Refers to a troublesome situation as well as an exaggerated amount of money.
Kannie is dood van kruiwa stoot - lit "(I can't) died from pushing a Wheelbarrow". The phrase "ek kan nie" (shortened to kannie = cannot/can't) is personified as a lazy man. The phrase is used as a form of motivation and discipline, implying that if you can do a physical task as easy as pushing a wheelbarrow, then you are more than capable enough to do any kind of hard work.
 katspoegie – lit. "kat's spit". Refers to a very small amount of something, similar to "bietjie" (a little bit)
 khaki –  derogatory term for an English person. From the colour worn by British troops, as well as the traditional clothes worn by Boere (Afrikaans speaking white farmers).
 kêrels – police (original Afrikaans meaning: guys, chaps). "The kêrels are coming, watch out!" (dated). More commonly referring to boyfriend or literal translation: Guy or young man. Dutch – kerels.
 kerrie-en-rys – lit. "curry and rice", is a popular South African variant of a curry usually served with rice and blatjang
 kief, kif, kiff – (adjective) wicked, cool, neat, great, wonderful. The word derives from the Arabic word kif كيف, meaning pleasure or marijuana. This may also be related to the Afrikaans word for poison: gif. Coastal pot-smokers used the term to refer to Durban Poison: "Gifs" [locally-grown marijuana]. The word evolved into kiff, an adjective or exclamation meaning "cool", among English-speaking people on the east coast.
 kie-kie/kiekie/kiek-kie – pronounced "key-ki"; refers to a photograph
 Klaas Vakie - (pronounced "klaas faacky") refers to the mythical creature known as the Sandman, can also ironically refer to people who had just now woken up late.
 klankie – lit. "a sound", Can also mean unpleasant smell. Used in conjunction with "klank". Pronounced as in "clunk"
 klap – to smack. (from Afrikaans). "He got klapped in the bar". Like a "bitch-slap", but much worse. Another variation on this is the "kopklap" (getting slapped hard over the head), typically done by a parent of authority figure as a form of discipline.
 klikkie klik bek – lit. a tattle tale
 klippies, klippies n coke – Klipdrift, a brandy preferred by mostly Afrikaans men, usually leading to chinas getting bliksemed
 klipslag – lit. "stone-stroke". Used to jokingly refer to a person who can't swim even if their life depended on it and thus sinks like a stone in water, this is mostly a joking self-reference by pessimistic swimmers.
 klokke – lit. "bells". The plural of the word "klok" (derived from "clock"). It also refers to a man's testes.
 koebaai - an anglicism of "goodbye".
 koek – lit. "cake". Can be used to refer to a response to a sticky situation: "O Koek" (Oh Shit); clumped hair that is messy: Jou hare is gekoek (Your hair is very messy and difficult to brush); Can also refer to a vagina.
 Koeksister – A sweet pastry that's been fried and dipped in a honey syrup, and shaped in the form of a French-braid. It doesn't have anything to do with a sibling - "sister" is "suster" in Afrikaans. The "sis" refers to the sound it makes when fried in oil. Alternative spelling is koesister. It also can refer to lesbians, or female genitalia: "I can like to be teasing my koeksister while I are wearing a rokkie"
 koffie-moffie – a camp male waiter or male flight attendant. See "moffie".
 komme-sie komme-sa - lit. "either-or". An expression, of French origin, that states the user isn't sure about an answer and doesn't care either. Similar to the expression "tamato-tomato".
 kont – same as "cunt" in English (profanity)
 koppie - lit. "cup". Also refers to a relatively small hill, (with "koppie" being the diminutive form of "kop") in reference to it appearing like a small head (kop) poking out of the ground.
 kopraas – lit. "head noise". someone who talks endlessly
 kortgat – lit. "short arse". Cutesy nickname given to shorter-than average people, can be considered offensive unlike its antonym "langeraad".
 kotch - (from "kots") lit. "to vomit" (vulgar)
 krimpie – old person
 kraaines – lit. "crow's nest". While the original English meaning stays intact, it can also refer to a big mess. Whether it be messy hair, a messy bedroom or a loud and messy gathering, like a party.
 kreef – literally means "crayfish" but it refers to a promiscuous woman with the intent to attract men.
 kry 'n kramp! – lit. "get a cramp". A definitive expression of strong disagreement, usually used to end an argument regardless if the issue was resolved. Can also be used to refer to exaggerated negative feelings towards a stubborn person: Ek wens hy kry 'n kramp! (I wish he gets a cramp!). Used in conjunction with "gaan kak!".
 kwaai – cool, excellent (Afrikaans: "angry". Compare the US slang word phat.)
 kydaar – visitor from northern provinces, especially Gauteng, to Cape Town; from "kyk daar!" – "just look at that!". See also "soppiekoppie".
 kyk teen jou ooglede vas - lit. "looking through closed eyes". Contrary to "kyk aan die binnekant van jou ooglede" (which means to take a nap, or go to sleep), it refers to a person who is wide awake, yet cannot spot the item they're looking for that's right under their nose. Used in conjunction with "As dit 'n slang was, dan sou hy jou gepik het"
 laatlammetjie - lit. "late lamb", refers to the youngest child in a family, specifically if there is a significant age-gap between the child and their older sibling (or more specifically when there is 3 or more siblings; the 2nd youngest sibling). It should also be considered that the parents' are at an advanced age at that point. Laatlammetjies refer to a set of youngest siblings that are close in age to each other, but with a significant age gap between their older siblings. For example: Charlie Duncan (4yrs old) and Toby Duncan (1yr old), from the Disney Channel series Good Luck Charlie, are 12 and 16 years younger (respectively) than their older middle-brother Gabe Duncan.
 laf - to be silly or funny. Jy’s laf! You’re laf boet! “Ek klap ‘n ding wat laf raak!” (Jokingly “clap”). (Soft way of saying you’ve lost it or you’re a clown!)
 lag – to laugh. For example: They lag at the joke.
 laaitie, lighty – a younger person, esp. a younger male such as a younger brother or son
 lank – lots/a lot
 langeraad – (pronounced: "lung-A-raat") cutesy nickname given to a really tall person
 lang maer blonde man – a slight contrast to the phrase "tall, dark and handsome", it describes a goodlooking tall blonde-haired, and usually blue-eyed, man.
 laanie, larny – (n) boss, used in a different tone. (adj.) fancy
 las – 1. an act that is undesirable to commit, a burden. 2. To tell someone or suggest to stop doing an act. (origin: something that is slowing you or an object down; for example, "'n Las in die pad.", meaning "An object as in a stone in the road."). 3. To physically join two separate objects together: (Las die punte van die twee toue aanmekaar; Tie the two ends of the ropes together.)
 leeuloop - lit. "lion walk". Popularized by singer-comedian Robbie Wessels in the song of the same name, it refers to a sexual dance (but slightly more humorous than vulgar). The song mainly describes a man getting down on all fours, clenching two balls (of "any" type) between his legs and pretending to be a lion by roaring.
 lekker – (lit. tasty) It means pleasing, tasty, nice, good, great, delicious. Lekker is used for just about anything you find nice. "How was the party? Lekker", "I met a lekker chick last night", "local is lekker, a popular slogan promoting South African culture and produce", "How is that steak? Lekker bro". Unlike its English counterpart "nice", use of the word "lekker" is actually promoted instead of frowned upon despite being very commonly used. It is speculated that "lekker" will never become clichéd. 
 lorrie – lit. "truck". Derived from the English word "lorry" with an identical meaning, the term gained popularity after the British colonized South Africa. Though "trok" (the proper Afrikaans translation for "truck") is still in use, it has been heavily replaced with the slang term "lorrie". Is sometimes used to jokingly compare cars that are just as difficult to drive as an actual truck.
 los or loskind – lit. "loose, loose child."  A really slutty girl, usually wears revealing clothes and is easy to get with (for example: "Sarah is 'n fokken loskind!")
 loskop – air head, literally a "lost head" refers to someone whose head is in the clouds, clumsy, forgetful.
 loslappie – a person who sleeps around a lot (i.e. "whore/manwhore", but not as derogatory)
 lus – to have a craving for. "I lus for a cigarette". (Also see "smaak".)
 ma-hulle/ma-le/pa-hulle/pa-le – collective references to both parents which can be either centered around the mother (ma) or father (pa). Based on the word hulle (them).
maag wil werk - lit. "stomach wants to work", a polite way to say you need to shit as soon as possible. Often used in conjunction with "maag is omgekrap" (upset stomach).
 maak soos Rokoff en fokkoff! - lit. "make like Rokoff and fuckoff!" Of unknown origin, is a crude way of telling someone to go away. Is similar to the English sayings like: Make like hay" and "Make like eggs, and scramble".
 maaifoedie – motherfucker, as in "Jou maaifoedie"
 maat – friend (OED), also partner (wife, girlfriend)
 mal – mad, crazy, insane
 malhuis – lit. "looney bin"
 mallie – mother
 mamparra – idiot. Also refers to a dud or a brick made from recycled clay/mortar.
 melktert/milk tart – a traditional custard tart of Dutch origin. Unlike a conventional custard tart, a melktert has a strong milk flavour and is best served with a dash of cinnamon sprinkled on top.
 mengelmoes-kardoes - lit. "variety-case". Refers to a larger variety of "thrift" being on offer.
 mielie – millet corn (AmE) / maize (BrE), staple diet. The base ingredient of Mielie-meal, which is the flour of choice to make Pap (also called mieliepap), a popular type of porridge.
 mmchakawally – cigarettes
 moegoe – stupid person, coward, or weakling
 moffie – male homosexual (derogatory). Can be compared to "fairy". From "mofskaap", castrated sheep.
 moer – to hit / to fight with, for example: "he is gonna moer you" Also a word for a nut used with a bolt
 moerkoffie - is a strong blend of ground-coffee usually served with minimal milk in a tin-based mug.
 moer-meter – comically describes a person's temperament for their tolerance of bullshit. Derived from the red thermometer and used as a metaphor as illustrated by Donald Duck when he gets mad. Used in conjunction with "bloediglik vererg".
 moerse –  a very strong word for big, for example: "that's a moerse house"
 moer strip – a point in time when a person's patience has worn so thin, he could snap violently at any moment. Derived from a nut (moer) that strips its threads when excessive force is applied.
 moer-toe – stuffed up or destroyed (my car is moer-toe)
 mompie – retard ("Liesl, you are such a mompie!")
 mooi, man! - "well done, man", used as an expression of appreciation in another person's achievement.
 Moola - lit. "money". Is the English slang term for money as well as the name of the actual mobile-currency used in the now defunct Mxit.
 morne – boring, sterile, unexciting ("This is more morne than watching Saracens play!")
 mos – Afrikaans, implies that what has been said is well known or self-evident (a formal part of grammar, the closest English equivalent would be "duh!"). "Ek drink mos tee." ("I drink tea, duh!"). Used at the end of a sentence, as in "...Jy weet mos." ("...Obviously, as you know.")
 mossie-poep – lit. "sparrow-fart" based on the definition of "poep-ruik" (oversleeping in the morning), it refers to a very early "waking up time" in the morning, often more specifically before 6:00AM (before sparrows wake up, but after the cock's crow)
 muggie – bug, especially a little flying gnat
 mugwaai – cigarette
 "mung" - the term mung means to lose a life playing video games and it also represents  Pallsmoor jail, you gonna go to the"mung" when you stolen something and you get caught by police. 
 mxit taal – lit. "mix it language". Refers to the text-based grammar usage that was popularized by the now-defunct Mxit, a free instant messaging service. For example: Eng: How R U? Afrikaans: Hoe ganit? (Hoe gaan dit?); Eng: I'm gr8 (I'm great).

N–Z 
 naai (Afrikaans) – copulate; but strictly speaking "sew", from the action of a sewing machine needle.
 nè? – do you know what I mean/agree?, oh really?, is it not so? or British English "innit?". Similar to the French "n'est-ce pas" and the Portuguese "né?", meaning "Isn't it?", e.g. "Jy hou van tee, nè?" ("You like tea, not so?") (informal). The South African English equivalent is "hey", for example "Eish, its cold hey?".
 neuk – lit. "to hit", less vulgar than "moer", "donner" and "bliksem"
 negentien-voetsek - "nineteen-voetsek" (Commonly pronounced "neëntien"; "nie'an teen"), refers to a date in the early 20th century, with "voetsek" (go far away) referring to a very early date. Translation: a very long time ago, often used when the specific date isn't known.
 nogal – of all things. Term expressing a measure of surprise.
 nooit – lit. "never."  No way, unbelievable!
 nou – lit. "Immediately/now". Also means "narrow".
 nou-net – lit. "just now". Refers to an event that happened within a few minutes ago.
 nou-nou/now now – contrary to the original meaning of the English word "now", it means "in due time", and therefore can mean anything from "in the next five minutes" to "in the next five years".
 net-nou – lit. "just now."  Can refers to an event that happened a while ago, maybe within 12hrs ("I saw him just now").  Or some time in the future ("I'm coming just now"), which could mean anything from 5 minutes to 5 years, or never.  
 net-net - lit. "just just". Refers to something/someone that has either impeccable timing and/or is just shy from, and just far enough to, winning any competitive event. English equivalents are: "Just in the nick of time", "just shy of winning", "almost". For example: Ek het my eksamen vraestel net-net deur gekom (I just barely passed my exam).
 Nou gaan ons Braai! – lit. "Now we're gonna Braai!". Pokes fun at the procrastination of the braaier, who intends to start immediately, but doesn't start till much much later.
 O Griet! – lit. "Oh Gosh!". A catchphrase uttered by the beloved witch Liewe Heksie when calling out her magic horse, Griet, whom she's able to conjure-up with the phrase, though she never remembers his name and as a result she only ever summons him by accident whenever she's in panic. The popularity of the catchphrase ensured that it gained use via the general public and therefore is used by a person whenever their in a state of panic.
 O gonna Madonna – ("g" sound pronounced in the back of the throat) Derived from "O Gonna" ("Oh Shit", but not vulgar), the singer Madonna's name was added to the phrase by Leon Schuster for comedic rhyming effect, it has since become one of his signature catchphrases along with: "O gatta patata" and "Oh Schucks" (both mean "Oh Shit", and the latter was inspired by Leon's own last name). 
 oom – an older man of authority, commonly in reference to an older Afrikaans man (Afrikaans for "uncle")
 ou (diminutive outjie, plural = ouens, outjies) man, guy, bloke (also oke) (literally "old")
 ou toppie - lit. "old head." Refers usually to an elderly man and a father.
 ouballie – lit. "old little ball(s)."  Old man, dad; as in: "shaft me, ouballie" "My ouballie (father, dad) will be home soon".
 pap – also called "mieliepap", is a traditional maize ("mielie") porridge similar to grits; can also mean "deflated". Pap (porridge) is primarily known in three stages; all three are variant to the water-to-maize ratio: stywepap (lit. "stiff-pap"; 3/4 water-to-maize), phutupap/krummelpap (pap with a crumbly texture; 1/4 water-to-maize) and slap-pap (pap with a runny texture; 4/3 water-to-maize). Unlike most international porridges, pap (specifically the aforementioned phutupap and stywepap variations) is commonly served at both breakfast and dinner times in the Northern half of the country.
 paplepel – lit. "pap-spoon"; a wooden spoon used in the making of pap, but can also be used to give a hiding
 papgat – lit. "flat/uninflated hole."  Tired or weak.
 pap-sop-nat – very wet
 pak – lit. "to pack". Also means "to give a hiding", as the shortened version of pakslae, a "parcel of hidings"
 patat –  lit. "sweet potato". A favourite side-dish for Afrikaners, the name "patat" ("pah-tut") can also become a pet-name or term of endearment.
 plak – lit. "to stick". Can also refer to starting an informal settlement like a Township (Plakkerskamp)
 plakkerskamp/township – an informal settlement primarily housing non-whites of very low-income in poorly self-constructed houses known as "shacks"
 paraat – disciplined. Somebody who is paraat, generally has "houding" i.e. style / character
 paw-paw – lit. a Paw-paw fruit. Can refer to an idiot, but is less derogatory and often used to lightly joke with the person in question.
 perdedrolle is vye – lit. "Horseshit is figs". When someone is accusing another person of bullshitting them: Jy probeer my se dat perdedrolle is fye! (You're trying to tell me that horseshit is figs!)
 plaas – lit. "farm". Also, when someone falls down: Plaas gekoop. As a verb, it translates to "placed down" or "put down"
 platteland – lit. "flat land", refers to a rural area, country (as in living in the country, as opposed to living in the city). The "flatness" refers to the fact that the area is geographically similar to farmlands.
 plaas se prys - lit. "the price of a farm". Refers to anything that is considered too expensive regardless of its actual worth, considering that a farm is one of the most expensive pieces of property one could privately own.
 platsak – lit. "flat pocket."  Out of cash, flat broke
 piel – derogatory term for a male genitalia ("cock" or "dick")
 piele – everything is cool, e.g.: piele vir Sannie
 piesang, piesang, paw-paw – lit. "banana, banana, paw-paw". Children's rhyme used when a person makes a fool of himself and/or is a sore loser.
 Piet Pompies — used to identify an anonymous man, similar to Joe Soap.
 poepol – (from poephol, arse) an idiot. lit. an arsehole (more specifically the anus), but not as derogatory. Can be used as source of comedy: Ek voel soos 'n poepol.
 poepolletjie – lit. Diminutive form of poepol, strictly reserved as a term of endearment between couples.
 poep – lit. "to fart". Derived from the English term "poop", it literally means "to pass gas".
 soos 'n poep teen donderweer – lit. "it's like farting against a thunderstorm". Meaning the argument being presented is falling on deaf ears due to either a much more intimidating defense, or just plain ignorance, i.e. the sound of the fart is being drowned-out by the sound of thunder. Its closest English counterpart would be "it's like talking to a brick wall".
 poepruik – lit. "to smell a fart". Refers to a person who is sleeping in late, though it specifically points to the person wasting time because of it.
 poes – derogatory term for female genitalia ("pussy" or "cunt" or "Ezekiel" )
 poesklap – lit. "vagina hit."  A very hard slap. similar to "klap" (to smack/slap), but far more painful: Ek gaan jou so 'n harde poesklap gee, jou tanne gaan vibreer vir maande lank. (I'm gonna smack you so hard, that your teeth will vibrate for months). Poesklap therefore is far more life-threatening than a "bitch-slap".
 FPK or flying poesklap – the deadliest of all the poesklaps
 poplap – derived from "lappop" (rag doll). It is a term of endearment towards young beautiful women, and can also extend to much younger girls usually via a grandfather-figure. The closest English equivalent would be "poppet".
 pote – lit. "animal paws". Is an informal reference to a person's feet ("voete" in Afrikaans) directly relating the condition and size of the feet to that of an animal's paws. Also derogatory term for police officers (plural).
 potjie – (pronounced "poi-key") lit. the diminutive form of the English/Afrikaans word "pot", referring to the cooking utensil, but more specifically a small-to-large sized cast iron pot that is traditionally used to make potjiekos, phutupap and samp (stampmielies).
 Potjiekos – lit. "small pot food". Is a meat and vegetable dish that is specially cooked in a potjie. It is traditionally slow-cooked over an open fire for a couple of hours before being served during a Braai (social gathering). Though it is similar to a stew, the main differences are: a stew has much water/sauce, while a potjiekos has very little water/sauce; and you stir a stew, you don't stir potjiekos as it is intended to not have the individual ingredients' flavor mixing. Potjiekos is traditionally served with phutupap or samp. Though it is considered a meal on its own, it can also be served as a side dish to braaivleis and Mielies (corn on the cob) (as both would take up a considerable amount of space on the plate).
Potte - lit. "Pots". Also refers to a huge behind. 
 pouse - (pronounced "po-ze"). As an anglicism it is derived from its English counterpart which means to temporarily stop an audio or video, or a musical break. In its Afrikaans pronunciation it refers specifically to an intermission in theatre and a school recess. Due to code-switching, the English pronunciation (in its original meaning) is also regularly used by Afrikaners, though it is separated from the Afrikaans pronunciation's meaning. For example: Ek moet die video pause (Eng pro.) omdat ons nou op pause (Afr pro.) gaan. (I have to pause the video because we're going on recess now.)
 praatsiek – lit. "talk sick."  Verbal diarrhea. A person who talks non-stop.
 praat 'n gat innie kop – lit. "speaking a hole in someone's head". To strongly convince someone to agree with you.
 quarter-past kaal arm – lit. "quarter-past naked arm". A sarcastic response to the question "What time is it?", whereby the user either doesn't know the time or doesn't care.  "Naked arm" refers to the person not wearing a wristwatch.
 rammetjie-uitnek - lit "ram with its head held high". Big-headed. Refers more to sporadic bragging rights, than egocentrism.
 reën katte en honde – lit. raining cats and dogs, ie: excessive rain
 renoster-snot - lit "rhinoceros snot". Prestik (a South African product similar to Blu Tack).
 rigting bedonnerd - lit. "directionless". Refers to any person who becomes easily disorientated when no visual references are helping their navigation, i.e. they feel lost very easily. It can also be used to humorously describe a person's poor sense of direction, for example: "James May can get lost in his own house."
 rietkooi - lit. "Reed bed", i.e. "bunk bed", considered out-dated as references to bunk beds in general fell out of use in favour of the English term. Original Afrikaans translation for "bunk-bed" is "stapelbed". Riet ("Reed") refers to the bunk bed frame's flimsy appearance while "kooi" is the slang term for a bed (specifically a single-bed), derived from the Capetonian dialect. "Kooi" is still in use in the Southern regions.
 rol - ("roll") A fight or brawl. Rolling - to fight.
 rooinek – ("red neck") Afrikaner derogatory term for English person or English-speaking South African. Derived in the 19th century due to native British not being used to the hot African sun and getting sunburnt, especially on the neck. Alternative explanation, reference to the fact that British officers during the two Boer Wars had red collars. 
 rooijasse/rooibaadtjies – lit. a red jacket/coat. Refers to the British soldiers of the Anglo-Boer Wars that wore red coats.
s'n - Pronounced similar to "sin" ("i" is less emphasized), it indicates possession. English Equivalent is the apostrophe ('s). Used in conjunction with "syne" (his) and "hare" (hers)
 saffa – lit. "a South African". Taken from the initials "S.A." as well as an informal pronunciation of the name "South Africa" (as Saf-Africa), the term refers to any South African-born person who also grew up in the country. This sometimes also extends to the South African Expats.
 sakkie-sakkie - Also known as the Sokkie dans, is a style of sensual Ballroom dance.
 sat – tired, dead – "Ek is siek en sat van sy nonsens" – "I'm sick and tired of his nonsense", see 'vrek' below (pronounced as "sut" in English)
 schoepit - pronounced "s-choo-pit", is the informal pronunciation of the word "stupid".
 scrompie – slang for "hobo" or bergie. (Liesl told her 7-year-old son, Karl, to walk away from the scrompie walking towards them.)
 se gat – expression of strong disagreement often used in conjunction with "se moer" & "jou gat" (your arse).
 sies, "sis" – expression of disgust, disappointment, annoyance, as in: Ag sies man.
 Sie-sah – expression of goodness, or of disgust, depending on context.
 sien jou gat – lit. "seeing your own arse". Refers to making an enormous fool of yourself and being out-performed & out-classed.
 skommel(draadtrek) – to masturbate
 soos Siebies se gat – lit. "like Siebies' arse". Refers to a job done badly and a messy room. Derived from a man of unknown origin known as "Siebies" (short for Siebert or Sieberhagen)
 soos 'n poep innie bad - lit "like a fart in a bathtub of water". Refers to something rising very quickly (literally like the bubbles caused by a fart), for example: Soos wat die vliegtuig opgestyg het, toe klim ons soos 'n poep innie bad tot by ons cruising altitude. (As the plane took off, we ascended like a fart in a bathtub to our cruising altitude).
 sit gat, rus bene – lit. "sit arse, rest legs". Refers to relaxing after a long hard day.
 skapie – someone who might be referred to as a "pussy". Literally "little sheep".
 skeef – skewed, gay, as in: hy het 'n bietjie skeef voorgekom (he seemed a bit gay)
 skief – to glare at someone (root: Afrikaans 'skeef', skew)
 skiet kat - Vomiting
 skop, skiet en boomklim – literally "kicking, shooting and climbing trees". A colloquial description of an action film, usually of the lighter, more humorous kind. (Think Jackie Chan.)
 skop, skiet en donner – literally "kicking, shooting and beating people up". A colloquial description of an action movie of the more violent kind. (Think Jean-Claude Van Damme and Arnold Schwarzenegger.)
 skelm – (pronounced: skellem) crook or trouble-maker, mistress, secret lover, on the sly
 skilpad het nie vere nie, en appels is nie pere nie – lit. "tortoises don't have feathers, and apples aren't pears". It is a children's rhyme that discusses a mistruth. It is the Afrikaans equivalent of "liar liar pants on fire."
 skinner, skinder – gossip
 skinderbek/skinnerbekkie - refers to the person(s) who is spreading gossip, not to be taken as a compliment.
 skort – watch out, be careful or something is wrong here
 skraal – "thin" or "emaciated"
 skrik – fright; also used in the phrase skrik my gat af (very big fright)
 skyf – cigarette, a puff, and also less commonly marijuana or dagga
 skuit – (pronounced "skate") lit. "to shit"; similar to "taking a dump"
 skwaanz – to snitch and sue; a bru dat overreacts to situations or activities they themselves participate in, like, they choke out people in the choking game and thinks dat is fun, but when someone chokes THEM out, they snitch and sue. Also, "squanz"; "Yo, dat bru is skwaanz! We don't hang wit daardie fok."
 slapgat – English translation is "lazy arse", also can refer to something badly put together, "Hy het dit slapgat gemaak" (he put it together haphazardly)
 slaptjips/ slapchips – (pronounced as "slup chips") similar to thick-cut British chips; usually soft, oily and soaked in vinegar. Slap is Afrikaans for "limp". French fries refers to thinly cut chips. Crispy potato/corn chips are referred to as 'chips'.
 smaak – "taste" also means, to like another person or thing.
 smaak stukkend – to like very much or to love to pieces (literal meaning of stukkend). "Ek smaak you stukkend" = "I love you madly".
 sneeudier – old person
 snoepie - (pronounced "snoopy") refers almost exclusively to a tuck shop based in a school. Tuck shops that are outside school property are often just called a "winkel" or "winkeltjie" (meaning "a small shop"), and sometimes also called a kafee (referring to a café, though not necessarily one that serves coffee). The original English usage of the term "Tuck shop" stays intact.
 snotklap - "i'll slap you so hard the snot will fly". Usually used to discipline a child.
 sel – lit."cell" in all definitions of the word, i.e.: selfoon (cellphone); tronk sel (jail sel); plant sel (plant cell)
 soek – to look for trouble with someone/to antagonise/to stir up trouble = "you soeking with me?" – Afrikaans: "to seek or look for".
 sommer – for no particular reason, "just because"
 sopdrol - diarrhea, someone with a weak constitution, literally soup poo
 soutpiel/soutie – derogatory term for English person, literally salty penis. Someone with one foot in England, the other in South Africa and their penis hanging in the Atlantic Ocean.
 soutpilaar – lit. "salt pillar". Refers to anyone who is standing and staring unnecessarily at something (whether it is at an object or into blank space, i.e. daydreaming) and isn't paying attention to his/her surroundings. Based on the biblical figure Lot's wife, who turned into a pillar of salt after disobeying God's command by looking back at the Destruction of Sodom and Gomorrah.
 spaarbussie/spaarbus – lit. "save-bus". Refers to a piggy bank.
 spookasem – lit. "ghost-breath". Refers to candy floss.
 springbok - lit. "springbok". As the antelope is the national animal of South Africa, its name has been used in several specialized fields to indicate a "belonging" to the country, incl: the former Springbok Radio (operated by the SABC), the South Africa national cricket team (was originally called the Sprinkboks, now called the Proteas due to disassociation with the Apartheid regime and the Springbok-emblem), the South Africa National Rugby Union Team (commonly called "the Springboks, or Bokke") and the call sign of South African Airways.
 spuitpoep - lit. "Diarrhea"
 spyker  – lit. "a nail". Can also refer to rough sex, similar to "naai".
 steek – stab, poke (with a knife). "He/she steeked her/him" = "He/she poked her/him". Also see "naai" = Nick steeked me stukkend.
 stoepkakker - a dismissive term for a small, yappy dog, usually of mixed breed and with white curly fur. While putting on a big show of barking, this dog is actually too afraid to leave the porch (stoep) and so ends up having to defecate (kak) there.
 stukkie, stekkie – a woman (from the Afrikaans meaning "a piece") – mostly used when referring to a woman that you have/have casual encounters with, girlfriend.
 stok sweet, lit. "a stick sweet", combination of Afrikaans word for stick (stok) and sweet. A lollipop.
 stompie – a cigarette butt, a short person or impolite term to refer to the remaining arm/leg/finger after an amputation.
 stukkend – (Afrikaans) broken, a lot.  Also commonly used when someone is hungover. For example, "I am so stukkend".
 Stuur Groete aan Mannetjies Roux - lit. "Send greetings to Mannetjies Roux" a popular folk song by Laurika Rauch about the titular Springbok Rugby Player. The song describes a young girl going to live on a farm with her aunt and uncle, who are avid supporters of South African Rugby Union player Mannetjies Roux (pronounced Munne-keys (in Afrikaans) Roux (as in French)). A film based on the song was eventually released in 2013.
 suig 'n duik in my kop – lit. "sucking a dent in my skull". Refers to a very strong sucking sensation caused by a thick viscous drink when drinking it through a straw, especially a McDonald's milkshake, which is famous for the sensation.
 swak – broke. Original Afrikaans: weak. "I'm swak, ek sê". Also used to suggest that someone's behaviour was harsh (with varying degrees of seriousness, depending on tone and context), for example: "It's swak that I failed the test."
 sy naam is Kom Terug en sy van is Bloedbek/Bloedneus – lit. "its first name is Come Back, and its last name is Bloody-mouth/nose/Or Else". A verbal warning given to a person who wants to borrow something.
te-moer-en-gone - an expression that comically states the levels of being lost. Can refer to either an object that is thrown out-of-bounds and is therefore lost, or more specifically getting lost in an area that is far from the nearest civilization. The closest English equivalent is "in the middle of nowhere".
 tekkies – running shoes. (The Anglicized pronunciation tackies has become mainstream in South African English.) Sports shoes that are specifically designed for running and often used for comfort.
 tiet – English equivalent "boob" or "breast" (from "teat"); tiete (plural); tietie (diminutive) and tieties (plural diminutive)
 tietie bottel - lit. "baby bottle".
 tet – breast or boob
 tjor/tjorretjie/tjorrie – diminutive description of a car, especially one that's being admired: This is a nice tjorretjie you got here!. (The "tj" is pronounced as the "ch" in chat.)
 tjorts - defecation, can also refer to the sound droplets of liquid make, often referring to a very minimal amount of a liquid ingredient, similar to "kat spoegie".
 toppie, ou toppie – father – see ouballie
 tos – lit. to masturbate
 trek – to move or pull. (The word has become international with the meaning of "making a pioneering journey"; the slang usage more closely resembles the standard Afrikaans meaning.)
 trekker - lit. "mover". Also refers to a tractor, as it can be used to tow (pull) trailers and/or cars.
 tannie – lit. "aunt/mother". Derived from the Dutch word tante (aunt), it refers to any older female authority figure. The female counterpart of "oom" (uncle). Though the original English meaning stays intact, the term has come to indicate a sign of tremendous respect towards a much older woman. Rules in using the term correctly are: The woman must be at least 10 years older than oneself, otherwise they might consider it offensive towards their age if they are young; unless she is one's real-life aunt, referring to a woman as "tannie" is purely permission-based, i.e. if she doesn't accept the term (and she'll tell you), then you should refrain from using it when addressing her.
 tiekie/tie-kie/ticky – taken from the word "tiekieboks/ticky box", is the popular name of the now outdated streetside payphone. Though ticky boxes are still in use, they have been largely replaced by cellphones. The ticky box takes its name from the limited time-period per call, based on the ticking of a timer. Also the name given to the old 2 and a half cent piece and later the 5 cent piece.
 tok-tok-tokkie – refers to a woodpecker, with "tok-tok" being the onomatopoeia of the sound the bird makes while pecking. Also refers to the woodpecker-style birds used in some cuckoo clocks.
 toktokkie – a children's game where you knock on someones door and run away before they answer.
trek deur jou hol - lit. "pulling something through your arse" refers to someone who has a tendency to ruin any property that was given to them whether they do it intentionally or not. Contrasts with the expression "kan dit deur 'n ring trek" (can pull it through a ring), which refers to something or someone that is extremely well polished, clean and organized.
 TVP (tiener velprobleem) – acne problems
 vaalie – mildly derogatory term used by people on the coast for a tourist from inland (Root: Old Transvaal province)
 vark – lit. "pig". Identical meaning to the English word in all of its interpretations, i.e.: pig, pork (varkvleis), arsehole (vulgar).
 van die os op die wa af - lit. "from the ox onto the wagon and off". Similar to "speaking of which" and "while we're on the subject"
 van toeka se dae af – lit. "since the olden days". Derived from the acronym "toeka", which is defined as the foundation of God's Word, which means it has been used since biblical times.
 veë jou gat aan dit af - lit. "wiping your arse on it". Refers to blatant ignorance against any person or object, no matter the consequences. Closest English equivalent is: "You don't give a shit."
 vellies – veldskoene, traditional Afrikaans outdoors shoes made from hide
 verkramp – politically conservative or pessimistic, the opposite of verlig, or enlightened
 vetkoek –  a deep-fried pastry that can either have a sweet filling of jam, honey, and syrup, or a savory filling of beef, chicken, pork, etc. Though the name literally translates as "fat cake", that name was already reserved by an English dessert, so in order to distinguish between the two very different dishes, vetkoek remains the universal name across all languages.
 viswyf - lit. "fish female", refers to a woman that throws a "bitch-fit" when she doesn't get her way. "Jy gaan soos 'n viswyf tekere!" (You're being really bitchy now!).
 voertsek, voetsek – get lost, buzz off, go away, run, scram, stuff off, bugger off (it can be considered rude, depending on the context) – usually used when referring to an animal. From the Dutch "vort, zeg ik" – used with animals, meaning "Go away!" or "Get moving". Voetsek is considered to be far more assertive than its English counterparts.
 voetjie-voetjie – lit. a game of footsie
 voël - lit. "bird". While the original meaning remains intact, it also refers to a penis (vulgar), due to "eiers" (eggs) being another nickname for testicles.
 voshaarnooi – lit. "a red-headed girl". Derived from the song of the same name, by Afrikaans singer Louis Van Rensburg, the song describes the beauty of a young fiery red-headed girl (voshare = red hair). The original Afrikaans term for a "red-head" is a rooikop.
 Volksie -  (pronounced as "folk-see") Is the local name of the Volkswagen Type 1 "Beetle" (based on the German/Afrikaans pronunciation - "folks-vach-en"). It essentially translates to "little Volkswagen". Also known as a "Volla".
 vrek – Afrikaans, meaning an animal dying. Possibly from Dutch verrekken to dislocate? Is considered extremely rude when used to refer to a person that has died, as the person would be likened to a mere animal.
 vroeg ryp, vroeg vrot - lit. "the quicker the fruit ripens, the quicker it will rot". Refers to anything that is being rushed.
 vrot – bad, rotten, putrid, sometimes drunk
 vrotbek – someone who swears a lot or is swearing a lot at the moment, as well as someone with bad breath.
 vry – to make out or courting (equivalent to American "necking", British "snogging" or Australian "pashing")
 Vrystaat vernier – shifting spanner
 vuilbek - lit. "dirty mouth", refers someone who swears a lot or is swearing a lot at the moment.
 vuil uil - lit. "dirty owl", an unsavoury character, a person of ill repute, guilt of transgressions
 waai – Afrikaans for "wave hello/goodbye". Slang for "to go". Durbanites like to say "Hey, let's waai pozzy." = "Let's go home." Also refers to the blowing of wind.
 dis n Weber dag/maand/koffie - Afrikaans slang to describe a good day or thing, using Weber. Originated from a High School teachers attitude and the students adopted it.
 waar val jy uit die bus uit/van die bus af? - lit. "Where did you fall off the bus?". Is a question usually asked when the person you are talking to, wasn't paying attention to the topic changing when they joined the discussion, and as a result they usually interrupt the discussion with an off-topic question.
 watookal – lit. "what also all."  Whatever.
 wakkerslaap - despite its original Dutch meaning "worry", it can also be used to verbally "wake-up" a drowsy person.
 windgat – lit. "wind hole."  A loquatious over-talkative, perhaps bragging person.
 woes – wild, untidy, unkempt or irreverent. A general term pertaining to either a person, behaviour or situation. Also could mean angry, in a rage, or sexually aroused.
 word wakker, die dag word al swakker! - lit. "become awake, the day is getting ever-weaker." A wake-up call in military fashion, usually is accompanied with loud banging on the door.
 wys – multiple meanings – to insult (see tune) or to say e.g. "Yoh, John wys me after I told him to shut up!". Also refers to "wysheid" (wisdom/wise) in a sarcastic tone: "O jy dink jy's wys né! (You think you're smart huh, do you!)
 yoh – an expression of surprise e.g., "Yoh, that was rude" "Yoh, you gave me a fright!", (Police-chief talking about the poor physique of his policemen): "They should look at our men and say "yoh!".
 ysterperd - "iron horse", describes a motorcycle, specifically a Harley-Davidson-style "full-size" motorcycle. Is derived from the fact that a motorcycle, with all its uses, is the modern day equivalent of a horse-and-rider.
 ystervarkie(s) – lit. "iron piglets". Also known by their English/Australian name "Lamingtons", these are small cubes of sponge cakes dipped in chocolate syrup and covered in desiccated coconut. It takes its Afrikaans name from the ystervark (Afrikaans for porcupine) due to its resemblance to the animal.
 zap - while the original English usage remains intact, though the term "to shock" is preferred, it also refers to one's obscene usage of the middle finger, while a "double-zap" would be where both middle fingers are extended at the same time.
 zef – from the Ford Zephyr car, cheap to tune up; cool, rough guy; common person; kitsch, trashy
 zol – a homemade cigarette rolled with old newspaper or Rizla pape, possibly marijuana-filled, equivalent to American "doobie"

Words from Khoi languages 
aitsa – is usually used when exclaiming agreement like you would when saying "sweet!", "nice!", "lekker!", and "got it!".
buchu – a wonderful smelling range of medicinal plants.
dagga – marijuana (has become a mainstream word in South African English) (from Khoe daxa-b for Leonotis plant)
eina – exclamation of pain, as in ouch (from Khoekhoe exclamation of pain or surprise)
goggo – bug (from Khoe xo-xo, creeping things, here the g is pronounced like ch in Scottish loch)
kaross – garment made of animal skin (from Khoe meaning skin blanket)
kierie - a walking stick, or cane, usually made of wood. Primarily used by the elderly as general usage of a cane fell out of fashion among younger generations, though people still have a habit of when carrying a stick to use it as a walking stick, even though they don't necessarily need it.

Words from Xhosa, Zulu and the other Nguni Languages 

The following lists slang borrowings from the Nguni Bantu languages (which include Zulu and Xhosa). They typically occur in use in the South Africa townships, but some have become increasingly popular among white youth. Unless otherwise noted these words do not occur in formal South African English.
abba – the act of carrying a child on your back. Is a tradition of tribal African women to carry their young hands-free on their backs by literally binding them in a sarong-like garment, emulating the pouch of a Kangaroo.
Aikhona! – not on your nellie; nice try.  Sometimes a strong refusal/disagreement, No!
tjhaile/tshayile – (pronounced: chai-leh) "time to go home"
cava – meaning "to see: (the c is pronounced as a dental click). It can be used meaning both "to see" or "to understand" as in "Did you cav that ?" or as in "Do you cav what I am saying?"
cocopan – small tip truck on rails used in mines (from Nguni nqukumbana, Scotch cart)
donga – lit. "wall" (Xhosa).  Small erosion channel, akin to arroyo in Mexico.
 eish! – an interjection expressing resignation
fundi – expert (from Nguni "umfundisi" meaning teacher or preacher) – used in mainstream South African English
faka – to put (pronounced as fuh-kuh) from the common Nguni word meaning the same thing, faka
gogo – grandmother, elderly woman (from Mbo-Nguni, ugogo)
hawu! – expression of disbelief, surprise. Pronounced like English "how!". From the Zulu "hawu".
hayibo! – has no direct English translation. It's used as an exaggerated response to something and can be apply to any situation (from Zulu, 'definitely not').
indaba – meeting of the community (from Nguni, 'a matter for discussion'); has become a mainstream word in South African English in the sense of consultative conference.
inyanga – traditional herbalist and healer (compare with sangoma)
jova – injection, to inject (from Zulu)
laduma! – a popular cheer at soccer matches, "he scores!" (literally: "it thunders", in Nguni)
Vati - water, kasi word for water,also the name of a water purification company from standerton Sakhile
muti – medicine (from Nguni umuthi) – typically traditional African
Mzansi – South Africa (uMzantsi in Xhosa means "south"), specifically refers to the South Africa.
Ngca – (pronounced "Ngc-ah", dental click) an expression of appreciation or admiration, similar to "nice"
 ousie – Term used to refer to a maid, usually a black female; also used by black females to call/refer to each other (from Sesotho for 'sister)
sangoma – traditional healer or diviner
shongololo (also spelt songalolo) – millipede (from Nguni, ukusonga, 'to roll up')
Tshisa Nyama - of Xhosa origin, lit means to "burn meat". Is the Zulu equivalent to the braai.
spaza – an informal trading-post/convenience store found in townships and remote areas (also a term referring to something cheap and nasty – i.e. of poor quality)
tokoloshe – a dwarf-like water sprite, taken from tokoloshe.
toyi-toyi – (more commonly spelt toi-toi) protest-dancing; used in mainstream South African English
tsotsi – gangster, layabout, no gooder
ubuntu – compassion or kindness, humanity, connectedness
Vuvuzela – a traditional horn made from the hollowed-out horns of a Kudu bull. It produces a monotonous tone and is often used as a summonings. A modernized version is made from plastic and more closely resembles a straight trumpet. The modern version is commonly used by the audience at soccer games, though usage of it has been highly frowned upon and in some cases banned because of noise-regulations, due to its incredibly loud blaring monotonous tone.  
Ntwana yam> A friend of yours
Ewe – lit. "yes" (Mbo-Nguni)
wena – Literally "you" (Mbo-Nguni). Commonly used in a sentence "Hayiwena!"

Slang originating from other countries 

The following slang words used in South African originated in other parts of the Commonwealth of Nations and subsequently came to South Africa.

 bint – a girl, from Arabic بِنْت. Usually seen as derogatory.
 buck – the main unit of currency: in South Africa the rand, and from the American use of the word for the dollar.
 china – friend, mate (from Cockney rhyming slang china [plate] = "mate"). 
 chow – to eat
 coaster – a state of affairs that surpasses cool
 pom – name for an English person originating from England
 shab short for shebeen.

Slang terms originating from ethnic minorities

South African Coloured slang 

The majority of Coloureds in South Africa speak Afrikaans.  Those who speak English use the equivalent English words as slang.
 Girl - Meisie
 Girlfriend - Noi
 Awe – "Howzit", "hello"; a slang way of greeting someone
 befok – "mad"; also possibly "super cool", as in My broe daai kar is befok. Pronounced \ber fork\.
 betters – "To replenish" or "refill". Example: Ekse lets make a betters with the mineral
 boss – "nice" – "that girl is boss, ek sê"
 boppin – "Very Good", example: "awe ekse my brah, howzit your side?"; in reply: "nei, eks (i am) boppin brah"
 bot – refer to gaam usually associated with a person, act or object that is either dodgy or gangster-like. (Originated from Afrikaans slang bot.)
 bushie – derogatory term for a "Coloured" person. Derived from the word bushman. Bushman are predominantly light in complexion.
 guy – similar to the American English word "dude"
 bok – girlfriend
 bolt/ace out – used extensively in KZN.  Means "by yourself" or "only one".
 chop – "stupid" or "pathetic" – "don't be such a chop (idiot)"
 chup – "tattoo" – "cool chup exse"
 chow – "eat" or food
 chuck – "leave".  Equivalent of American "to bounce". Examples: "Come bru lets chuck" or "sorry can't go to the braai i gotta chuck." If you are funny you might say, "boet, I have to make like Norris and Chuck."
 crown/kroon – "money"; can also refer to virginity.
 dowwel – "gamble"/ "nice or tasty" Examples: "He is going to dowwel all his money he earned." "That food dowwel."
 dasifouti – "no problem", lit. "there is no fault"
 duidelik – direct from Afrikaans, meaning "clear"; used to express clarity on something or excitement about something.
 eksê – from Afrikaans, translated it means "I say". Used in greeting i.e. "Whakind eksê" or in general speech.
 gaam – dodgy/gangster i.e. That person is gaam. (He is a gangster.)That place is gaam. (it is dodgy.)
 gam – derogatory term for Coloured people in South Africa. Derived from "Gham" or "Ham" referring to Ham in the Old Testament. It is a reference to the children of Noah's son Ham who were illegitimate and cursed into slavery by God.
 gammie – diminutive of "Gam", derogatory term for coloured people in South Africa, particularly in Cape Town.
 gatsby – large chip roll with meat and lekker sauces (Cape Town)
 gully – "area" or "corner" (KZN)
 hard up – "in love"
 Hosh – "Hello"; also used before combat. Example in combat: Hosh, jy raak wys ("Hello, show me what you made of"). This gang-related word occurs inside as well as outside of prison: use at own discretion (Black Slang).
 jas – "horny". The first form occurs in Cape Town; the second predominates on the east coast of South Africa.  May also mean "crazy" or "mad". Examples: Person A: I want to get robbed Person B: Are you jas? or Person A: Ek wil my werk verloor Person B: Is jy jas?.
 jap/jep - "steal". "They jepped that okes car" used in Gauteng.
 lekker/lukka – "nice" (from Afrikaans). The first form occurs more commonly; the second predominates in Kwa-Zulu Natal.
 lappie(pronounced *luppee*) – "cloth", "dish towel", "face cloth"
 maader – "the best", "excellent"
 meet up – Used in the Kwa-Zulu Natal region, a term usually used when saying "goodbye". For example: Lukka meet up ekse. 
 miff – "gross", "disgusting". "That's completely miff!" "Oh my god it was so miff"
 min – to be very interested or excited in something, or for something. For example, "so min for that jol" or "when you're min you win"
 mineral – pronounced 'min ral'; used by Indians as well.  "Fizzy drink" such as Coke, Fanta, Sprite, etc. (KZN)
 motjie – wife/woman
 naai – "sex" (Western Cape) Also used as a noun "Jou ou naai" (literally "You screw") and used in the plural: "naaie"  (literally more than one "screw"), meaning an undesirable person rather than the sexual act. Definitely not polite language.
 oweh – pronounced \ow where\, a way of saying "oh yes" or expressing delight.
 posie/pozzie – "home". Afrikaans-speakers tend to use the first for; English-speakers the second.
 press – "sex", as in: "I want to press my young one tonight" (KZN)
 shot – "good", "cool", "correct" or "thanks" (depending on context). Example for the meaning "good" – Person A: What is 3+3? Person B: six Person A: shot. Example for the meaning "thanks": – Person: A I have bought you a sweet Person B: Shot.
 sunno – initially an insult, but  used amongst friends as a greeting, as in: Whakind son
 Stukkie – "girl" or possibly "girlfriend"
 Tannie – "aunt", used by Afrikaans-speakers
 Taah-nie – "Mother", used by some Cape Townians
 tops – "excellent", "the best", "great!"
 Toppie – "old man", used by Afrikaans-speakers, can also mean 'dad', ex: 'My friend recently became a Toppie'
 Whakind – a greeting (Used as "Howzit" in KZN), usually used amongst guys only, and frowned upon when used in greeting women.  This word can also express an enquiry about something, especially when used outside the Kwa-Zulu Natal region.
 What say/What you say/Wat sê jy – alternative for Whakind in the greeting-sense. English-speakers use the first and second forms; Afrikaans-speakers the third.
 Young one – Refer to "Stekkie"
 Skommel – masturbate
 onetime – of course, without delay; often used as a positive reply to a question.
 operate – lets perform or to have sex
 ou – a boy/man/guy, homo sapiens
 Charr Ou/Charou/charo – Charr is from charring from the sun like charcoal (burnt wood) derogatory term for an Indian, Bangladeshi or Pakistani person
 Bruin Ou – a Coloured person – mixed race
 Wit (pronounced as vit) Ou – a White person
 Correct Ou – a good guy
 Gorra Ou – a White person (insulting usage)
 Darkie ou/ darky ou – a derogatory term for African/black person
 Pekkie Ou – a Black African person (derogatory; from the Zulu word for "cook")
 Slum Ou – a Muslim person (derived from the words Islam/Muslim)
 Exploding Ou – a Muslim person (insulting, derogatory usage)
 boss – a salute to a person, usually of higher authority or status (usually to a male), as in "you know what it is boss".
 bra – a way of addressing a friend, as in 'Howzit my bra'. 'bra' derived from 'brother'
 bung – (from Afrikaans 'bang' — to be scared) to be afraid of someone.
 condai – bus conductor.
 graft – work, e. "hey kazzie, I'm grafting at coconut grove, lakkaz ekse"
 kêrel – boyfriend
 hit a luck – expression, to meet with good fortune, as in, "hey my bru hit a luck, eee got graft at the Casino".
 choon/tune – talk/to tell someone something.
 clips – Money,  1 clip = R100
 laanie – From the Afrikaans word meaning "fancy", but used by Indian people to mean "smart guy" ("Smart" as in "well-to-do") or, more frequently, "boss". Compare larnie.
 lakkaz – meaning lekker from the Afrikaans language.
 late – A euphemism for dead/deceased; as in 'My daddy is two years late'. (Unconnected with the idea of tardiness.)
 let's vye – let's go; (waai pronounced as vuy, same like buy) (From Afrikaans, "kom ons waai") Used mostly by Durban Indians. "Dave let's vye sook a betters.""
 maader – excellent, very good (used especially by KZN people of Indian origin)
 min-rill – from the English word "mineral", meaning mineral water; taken to mean any fizzy drink in a bottle, normally Coke, Fanta, etc.
 plot – pursue romantically, courting
 poke – stab
 pozzy – house or home; place where one lives or hangs out.
 perrie – paranoid; "He is moerse perrie"
 pehrer – a fight. (Often heard as "Who's gunning a pehrer?" meaning "Who's looking for a fight?")
 slaan – wear (as in clothes), ex "He is ge (prefix) slat (slaan) clothingwise"; meaning "He's dressed well"
 Vrou – my wife, as in 'Ek sê, I must first ask my Vrou'; from the Afrikaans word for 'wife"/"woman".
 vying – going, as in we vying to the soccer
 vriete – "food" from the Afrikaans word "Vreet" – "to eat like an animal". Used as a noun, ex: He must kyk(look) sy(his) eie(own) vriete(food) translated: He must find his own food
 dite  – food(noun), ex: "i smaak(like to) a dite(food) kry(to get)"
 dite  – food(verb), ex: "ek(i) gaan(to go) eers (firstly) dite(to eat)"
 speech – an argument/fight 
 stekie – girl/girlfriend
 swaai – to dance. (For example: "Lets vaai (go) swaai.")
 swak – bad or weak 
 what kind – Greeting, similar to Howzit
 what what – mostly used in arguments, meaning "this and that". Often heard as what you say what what
 spiet – to fight
 slow boat – Splif/joint – normally related to marijuana
 para/pareh – to fight/argument
 pulling moves – related to doing some sort of crime or fraud
 100's / hundreds – relating to being ok, for example: "I am hundreds today after last night's jol"
 bust up – a big party involving abundant drugs and booze
 pull in – literally means to come; example: "Pull in to my pozzy tonight, gona have a bust up"
 benou – (pronounce BER-NOW) – marijuana or dagga. Commonly used by Indians in Gauteng. "no benou there?"-do you have any dagga?
 sharp – goodbye, ("shap im out" – goodbye I'm leaving)
 aspriss – to do something deliberately ("I closed the door on him aspriss")
 gusheshe – BMW 325is (Black Slang).
 arrawise – greeting, derived from the English word 'otherwise' ("arrawise bra watse?")
 Salut – Hello, hi, as in a greeting, or "dis (it's) salut (good) my bra (friend/brother)"
 Ben 10 –  someone dating a woman who is 1–10 years older than him or a young male partner of a cougar. The name comes from the Cartoon Network animated series of the same name.
 Blesser –  This is a high level sugar daddy, but with a lot more money. He's filthy rich, and can set a lady up with clothing accounts, overseas holidays and sometimes even a car in exchange for sex benefits. The lady is expected to be readily available at all times when the blesser needs her (Black Slang).
 Blessee –  a lady who dates a blesser (Black Slang).
 Bosoh – Commonly known as weed or dagga. "Jdogger roll the bosoh there. Im keen to get blazed"
 Make the thing there –  This is commonly used with the word betters referring to the purchasing of a bag." Make the thing there Lyles. Make a betters for the boys"
 Chow a bean – A bean which is also known a blue boy, is commonly used at the end of a sesh to cut things before they get dangerous "We on day 4 now Cheeno. Time to call it and chow a bean."
 Beef – A small Muslim boy also known as tokoloshe.
 Gup – Indian slang for a lie. Can be used as a verb which is "gupping" or past tense "gupped". "I told Cheeno I got a backdoor into Wikipedia. That guy got gupped hard""
 Let's have it – A commonly used phrase to instigate the start of a past time activity. Can be used for anything leisure, from FIFA to a betters (Please refer to the definition of betters above). "Lets have it there quick Stanosh before more owes come"
 Jux – To be horny or excited. "Ekse this betters is making me jux"
 Catch a press – To have sexual intercourse which lasts only a few moments due to being jux. "Bra, im so jux, lets vye catch a press said Cheens"

South African Portuguese slang 

 maburro – slang for a white Afrikaans person, usually derogatory but sometimes used affectionately depending on context. (a "burro" in Portuguese is an ass, donkey or stupid person.)
 padece – slang for a white Afrikaans person, usually derogatory but sometimes used affectionately depending on context.

South African Indian slang 

Many of these terms occur in the Cape Town and Durban areas, and few in Indian areas in Gauteng. Many words are shared with Coloured slang, such as pozzie (in Durban) and let's waai.

cake – idiot
cameway – to go with someone, like come with me. Used in Durban.
Charo – a person of Indian origin. From the word "curry" (or tea).
eeuww man! – an informal way of greeting. The South African Indian equivalent of "Hey dude!"
guzzie – friend (from the Zulu gaz'lami)
Jaaver – an Afrikaner person
kassam – serious, not joking. From Islamic meaning "oath".
mooing – to flirt. From the Afrikaans word mooi meaning "nice"/"pretty".
 nana – grandfather (Not a slang words, but a Hindi and Urdu word meaning maternal grandfather)
 ou – person
 Roti Ou / Bread Ou Hindi person
 Wit Ou – a White person
 Porridge Ou – a Tamil person
paining – having pain
pano – money, from the Tamil word for "money". Commonly used by all South African Indian linguistic groups as a euphemism for money (not slang).
 patla, flouie – usually refers to poor (unfunny) jokes. Patla can also refer to any kind of damp squib. Patla Patla often refers obliquely to having sex; imitating the sound of two bodies meeting.
 potter-marie – means a dumbass (Hindu language roots)
right – an affirmation, mostly used while giving traffic directions, as in "Go straight, Right. Turn Left, Right."
sheila – an ugly woman
slaat – action like hit. For example: Don't choon me what what an' all, I slaat you one time laanie.
this thing/"dis ting" – watchamacallit
y'all - "you all"  appears across all varieties of South African Indian English. Its lexical similarity to the y'all of the United States is attributed to coincidence.

South African Jewish slang 
 chattis, khateis (plural chatteisim, khateisim. Yiddish: "a sinner"): approximately equivalent to "white trash". The word refers particularly to poor, white, Afrikaans-speaking communities with endemic social problems. Sometimes used as an ethnic slur against Afrikaners in general. From Talmudic phrase  Eyn bor yerey khet – a bor – (uncouth ignoramus) is not afraid of sin. The bor-Boer assonance gives a case for quibble: if not afraid of sin must be therefore a sinner.
 kugel: an overly groomed, materialistic woman (from the Yiddish word for a plain pudding garnished as a delicacy). Older-generation Jews coined this usage as a derogatory label for Jewish women who aspired to become part of the privileged English-speaking white community.  usage, often humorously intended, applies the word to any nouveau riche women in South African society who appear overly groomed and materialistic. Bagel and bagel-boy occur as labels for the male counterpart of the kugel. (Compare the American-English term Jewish-American princess which has subtly differing connotations.)
 Peruvian / Peruvnik: a low-class, unmannered and unsophisticated person regardless of wealth, usually Jewish. The etymology is unclear. (Theories: (a) Yiddish corruption of Parvenu; (b) derives from an acronym for "Polish and Russian Union", supposedly a Jewish club founded in Kimberley in the 1870s, according to Bradford's Dictionary of South African English.) The more assimilated and established Jews from Germany and England looked down on this group, and their descendants remain stigmatised.
 Schwarzer: Yiddish / German for "black" – a black person
 shiksa: as in other Jewish communities, this means "non-Jewish girl". Traditionally "slave-girl", from the Yiddish version of the Hebrew word for "dirty, unclean, loathsome" In South Africa, however, it has the additional meaning of a "female domestic worker".
 weisser: Yiddish for "white" – a white person

South African Lebanese slang 

 bint: from the Lebanese word for "girl"; used in reference to women in general (as in "check out that hot bint over there.")
 drib: from the Lebanese word for "hit" (as in "hey ghey ... if you don't stop talking gara, I may have to drib you!")
 khara: from the Lebanese word for "faeces" or "dung"; refers to something that is crap (as in "that guy is talking khara!")
 ghei: literally translated from the Lebanese word for "brother"; in colloquial South African refers to "a tinted-windows, lots-of-jewellery" kinda guy (pronounced like gHAY but with a /x/, like a guttural "g" or the "ch" in Scottish loch)
 stiffle: so what: "if you don't like it stiffle!"

Special-use slang

Kasi / township slang 
 411 – giving someone the latest news and gossip.
 5 Jacket, Half clipper, 5 Tiger, pinkies, 5Ten – R50 note
 2 Bob – 20-cent coin
 442 (Four, four, two) – lies or lying.
 150 – Ladysmith/Emnambithi (KZN)
 69 (Six nine) – It is to pee.
 9 (nine) – Girlfriend as in a love relationship.
 Peepee, 45 (four five) or Ntutu – Penis.
 6 no 9 – "same difference". Like "potato, potatoe".
 99 (nine nine) – "for real"
 ayoba – expression of excitement
 bokgata  or  Bo 4 – "the police"
 cake/ikuku/kuku – Vagina or a scone depends on context.
 Chalk/choc – R20 note
 chommie – More likely to be used by young girls than guys, the word refers to a friend. A music artist goes by this name.
 clipper/lkippa – R100 note
 doing a bafana – demanding more smeka (money) for being mediocre
 doing a benni – The saying comes from the formerly much-lauded Bafana Bafana striker Benni McCarthy's "uncharitable habit of turning his back on his country" following many instances of failing to turn up to play in the South Africa national football team. Meaning "showing disloyalty / being irresponsible".
 eish – [compare Bantu usage above] (pronounced like /aysh/ but also, less often, as /ish/) – Used to express everything ranging from frustration to surprise to disapproval, but also just everyday acknowledgement of things you can't change like "Eish, the traffic is bad today". Heard frequently each and every day! Also used to indicate displeasure. For example: 'At the time I was the only black guy and I used to ask myself "Eish, what am I doing here?"'
 fong kong – cheap and fake products that one can buy from vendors on the streets.
 Tiger – R10 note (from the word "jacket") 
 Yoh - Exclamation/reaction to something shocking or surprising
 juish (pronounced /Joowish/) – refers to nice and flashy clothes that someone has on.
 moegoe – a fool, idiot or simpleton. For example: "moegoe of the week". Related to the Nigerian term mugu, fool, fraud victim.
 mzansi – from the isiXhosa words, Mzantsi Afrika; a common term which means South Africa. [Mzansi] List of colloquial South African place names first published in Y magazine.
  Pinkies – R50 note, because of its colour
 roogie – R50 note
 Ova – To talk
 O zo fa ntja! - You will die, dog 
 skoon – Kaal voël steek (without a condom). Generally unprotected sex
 starter pack – (Origins: Terminology first used by mobile-phone companies but quickly adapted by car thieves and car hijackers.) Refers to entry-level cars, especially vehicle-makes occurring commonly on the road and therefore less easy to spot as stolen. Thieves can "chop up" the parts at an illegal "chop shop" and used them for repairs on more expensive vehicles.
  Stena/isitina (from the Afrikaans word for brick) – A stack of money amounting to R1000
 umlungu – white South African or the boss (baas) of the company
 yebo – a Zulu word which means "yes".
 Z3 – refers to HIV and AIDS, because of its speed. This is a reference to the BMW Z3.
 Coconut – Referring to a self hating African black person who is dualistic in their nature. Black on the outside and White on the inside.
Machangura – Refers to cash or money.
Zaka – Money
Pompo – Tap water
Dintshang? – What's happening?
Ke shap – I am good.
Sati – Saturday
Spani – Work
Achuz – Friend (from "accused". Someone with whom you have committed a crime and appear in court alongside. "Can accused no.1 and accused no.2 please stand."
Choof - Crystal Meth

Gay slang also called 'gayle' 

Slang developed in the 1970s to allow the speakers to converse in public without drawing attention – usually referring to girls' names often with the first letter in common with the intended meaning:
 abigail – abortion
 ada – backside
 agatha – a gossip
 aida – AIDS
 amanda – amazing
 annie – anus
 barbara – straight man
 belinda – blind
 bella – to hit or slap "I will bella you if you don't stop staring at that beulah."
 bertha – Hilda's big sister (really, really ugly), after Big Bertha, the giant cannon
 beulah – beautiful, usually referring to a good looking man
 cilla – cigarette
 betty bangles – policeman
 carol – cry
 chlora – coloured person
 connie – come
 cora – common
 diana – disgusting or dead
 dora – a drink; drunk
 elsie geselsie – chatterbox
 erica – erection
 esterjie – ecstasy
 ethel – old person
 fiona – you can guess
 frieda – sexually frustrated
 fuella – furious
 gail – chat
 gayle – the name for this slang
 gonda – a vagina
 grazelda – extremely ugly
 harriet – hairy man
 hilda – ugly (or horrible), usually referring to a not-so good looking guy
 iona – Indian
 jenny – masturbate
 jessica – jealous
 julia – jewellery
 lana – penis (from alliteration Lana Lunch)
 laura – lover
 lettie – lesbian
 lily - law (the police)
 lisa – male model
 lulu – laugh
 marie – mad
 marjorie – margarine
 mary – obvious homosexual
 mathilda – migraine
 maureen – murder
 mavis – effeminate queen
 mildred – mentally deranged
 milly – crazy (mad) – milder than mildred
 mitzi – small
 monica – money
 nancy – no
 natalie – native person
 nelly – neurotic
 nora – stupid or naive
 olga – old and ugly
 pandora – inquisitive queen
 patsy – dance, party
 polly – Portuguese homosexual
 priscilla – policeman
 reeva – revolting
 rita – rent boy
 sally – suck
 sheila – shit (action or insult)
 stella – steal
 trudy – someone that's beyond help
 ursula – understand/understanding
 vast – very ("She's vast nora, my dear!")
 vera – vomit
 wendy – white (caucasian)
 lodge – house
 pram – car

See also 
 List of lexical differences in South African English
 List of colloquial South African place names
 South African English

Example 

Jinne man, just put on your tekkies and your costume, don't be dof! We're going to walk to the beach and then go for a swim, if you want to come with you better hurry up, chyna. Ag nee, I stepped on a shongololo, I just bought new tekkies the other day! You know what, lets just forget about the beach and have a braai instead, all we need is some meat, mieliepap, some cooldrinks, maybe a brinjal and some other veggies. And if someone can bring some biscuits for a banofi pie that would be great. Hey bru, it's lekker day today for a jol ek sê! I'm warning you my dad won't tolerate any gesuipery, he'll klap you stukkend! Is it? Ja, he's kwaai! He was tuning me just now from his bakkie my bokkie is a soutie and a rooinek. Eish! Well at least he's duidelik.

References 

Languages of South Africa
South African
Slang
South African English